Eryx sistanensis is a species of snake in the family Boidae. The species is endemic to Iran.

References 

sistanensis
Reptiles of Iran
Reptiles described in 2020